Helen Schneider Dinerman (December 25, 1920 – August 14, 1974) was an American sociologist and public opinion researcher.

Biography 
Born in New York City in 1920, Dinerman received her education at Hunter College and Columbia University. Later, she worked as a researcher in the United States Office of War Information
and trained at the Bureau for Applied Social Research, the first academic research centre dedicated to survey research,
founded by Paul Lazarsfeld in 1944.
She became employed with the International Research Associates in 1948, and became Chairman of the firm's Executive Committee in 1968.

Dinerman died in Emanuel Hospital
in Portland, Oregon on August 14, 1974, while on holiday with her daughter.

Legacy 
In 1981, the World Association for Public Opinion Research established the Helen Dinerman Award – "in memory of Helen Dinerman's scientific achievements over three decades of public opinion research" – to recognize individuals who have made "significant contributions to survey research methodology".

Selected publications

References 

1920 births
1974 deaths
American sociologists
Columbia University alumni
Hunter College alumni
People of the United States Office of War Information
American women sociologists
20th-century American women scientists
20th-century American scientists
20th-century American non-fiction writers